La Coudre may refer to:

 La Coudre, Deux-Sèvres, a commune of the department of Deux-Sèvres, France
 , a former municipality of the Canton of Neuchâtel, in Switzerland
 La Coudre, Vaud, a village of the Canton of Vaud, Switzerland